The 2017 Telkom Knockout is the 36th edition of the Telkom Knockout, a South African cup competition comprising the 16 teams in the Premier Soccer League. It took place between October and December 2017.

Results

First round

Quarterfinals

Semifinals

Final

References 

Telkom Knockout
2017 in South African sport